Dmitri Vladimirovich Skobeltsyn (November 24, 1892 in Saint Petersburg – November 16, 1990) was a Soviet physicist, academician of the Soviet Academy of Sciences (1946), Hero of Socialist Labor (1969).

Dmitri Skobeltsyn was awarded the Stalin Prize (1950), six Orders of Lenin, two other orders, and numerous medals.

Starting in 1923, Skobeltsyn pioneered the use of the cloud chamber to study the Compton effect.  

As a result of this work, Skobeltsyn paved the way for Carl David Anderson's discovery of the positron by two important contributions: by adding a magnetic field to his cloud chamber (in 1925)
, and by discovering charged particle cosmic rays, for which he is credited in Anderson's Nobel lecture.

References

External links
 Skobeltsyn's photo – from the Russian Academy of Sciences

Soviet physicists
1892 births
1990 deaths
Burials at Novodevichy Cemetery
Heroes of Socialist Labour
Stalin Prize winners
Full Members of the USSR Academy of Sciences